The 2009 European Tour was the 38th series of golf tournaments since the European Tour officially began in 1972. 

There were major changes for the 2009 season as the tour entered a partnership agreement with Dubai based Leisurecorp. The Order of Merit was renamed the Race to Dubai with the addition of a new season ending tournament, the Dubai World Championship, being contested by the leading 60 players after the penultimate event for a US$7.5 million prize fund and a US$7.5 million bonus pool. 

The season began with five events in late 2008 and consisted of 54 official money tournaments. This was an increase of four from the previous year, although three events were ultimately cancelled, and included the four major championships and four World Golf Championships, which are also sanctioned by the PGA Tour. 27 events took place in Europe, 14 in Asia, 6 in the United States, 3 in South Africa and 3 in Australia.

The Race to Dubai was won by Lee Westwood, who finished as European number one for the second time. He won the season ending Dubai World Championship to overtake Rory McIlroy in the standings. Westwood was also named Golfer of the Year, with Chris Wood being named the Sir Henry Cotton Rookie of the Year, having recorded a 3rd-place finish in The Open Championship on his way to 44th on the end of season money list.

Major tournaments

For a summary of the major tournaments and events of 2009, including the major championships and the World Golf Championships, see 2009 in golf.

Changes for 2009
Changes from the 2009 season included two new tournaments, the Moravia Silesia Open in the Czech Republic and the Dubai World Championship, the addition of the Singapore Open, and the return of the World Match Play Championship after being cancelled in 2008. In addition, as a result of plans to realign the schedule with the calendar year for 2010, the HSBC Champions, Hong Kong Open and the Australian Masters were held twice during the 2009 season. The HSBC Champions became a World Golf Championships event effective with its November 2009 edition.

In December 2008 the Indian Masters, scheduled for February, was cancelled due to fallout from the ongoing financial crisis, and then in January 2009 it was announced that the revival of the English Open, scheduled for August, would be postponed for at least two years after developers of the St. Mellion International Resort ran into financial difficulties. In May it was announced that due to lack of sponsorship the British Masters had also been dropped from the schedule, with the Austrian Open being rescheduled from June to take its place on the calendar in September.

Schedule
The following table lists official events during the 2009 season.

Unofficial events
The following events were sanctioned by the European Tour, but did not carry official money, nor were wins official.

Location of tournaments

Race to Dubai
In 2009, the Order of Merit was replaced by the Race to Dubai, with a bonus pool of US$7.5 million (originally $10 million) distributed among the top 15 players at the end of the season, with the winner taking $1.5 million (originally $2 million). The new name reflected the addition of a new season ending tournament, the Dubai World Championship, held at the end of November in Dubai. The tournament also had a $7.5 million prize fund (originally $10 million), and was contested by the leading 60 players in the race following the season's penultimate event, the Hong Kong Open. The winner of the Race to Dubai also receives a ten-year European Tour exemption, while the winner of the Dubai World Championship receives a five-year exemption. The reduction in prize money, announced in September 2009, was due to the global economic downturn.

Final standings
Final top 15 players in the Race to Dubai:

• Did not play

Awards

Golfer of the Month

See also
2009 in golf
2009 Challenge Tour
2009 European Senior Tour
2009 PGA Tour
List of golfers with most European Tour wins

Notes

References

External links
2009 season results on the PGA European Tour website
2009 Order of Merit on the PGA European Tour website

European Tour seasons
European Tour